Kirkstall Forge railway station is a suburban station serving the Kirkstall area of Leeds, West Yorkshire, England. It is on the Leeds to Bradford Line between Leeds City and Shipley and was opened on 19 June 2016, near the site of an earlier station with the same name.

History
The original station opened on 1 July 1860 and closed on 31 July 1905. It was not considered worthwhile rebuilding it when the line was diverted onto a new bridge over the canal. A new station could provide opportunities for travel when space became available with the Kirkstall Forge Engineering closing in stages during the 1980s, 1990s and the early 2000s.

The new station, near the site of the original, opened on 19 June 2016. Metro, the Passenger Transport Executive for West Yorkshire, opened the station having already overseen the opening of nearby Apperley Bridge in December 2015.

Go-ahead for construction at Kirkstall Forge and Apperley Bridge was given in the National Infrastructure Plan released on 29 November 2011.

Facilities

The station has two platforms, with a footbridge and lifts linking them. A bus stop, 127 car parking spaces and secure cycle storage were also constructed along with the station.  Ticket vending machines are available and there are digital information screens and a P.A. system provided for train running information provision.

Services
On Sundays Leeds to Bradford Forster Square trains call once per hour each way.

In November 2017 the frequency of services was raised in the House of Commons by the local Member of Parliament and plans were subsequently announced to double the frequency between Kirkstall Forge and Leeds to 2 trains per hour from 20 May 2018 (though services were cut back again for several months in 2020 due to the COVID-19 pandemic).

Services to/from Ilkley no longer now stop at Kirkstall as a result of this change, with regular timetabled calls now provided by the Leeds - Bradford Forster Square trains (Ilkley connections are now available at Shipley).  Certain Skipton services also stop in the weekday peak and after 19:30 Mondays to Saturdays when the Bradford - Leeds service does not operate.  Sunday services remain unchanged.

Planning and construction

In 1999, Metro announced that Kirkstall Forge and Apperley Bridge were among five new or reopened stations which they wished to see achieved over the ensuing five years. Glasshoughton opened in 2005.

In July 2007, Leeds City Council approved a planning application to redevelop the Kirkstall Forge site, and the developer, Commercial Estates Group, committed £4 million to build a railway station and provide new rolling stock.

In September 2008, the West Yorkshire PTE announced that the Yorkshire & Humber Regional Transport Board had approved funding for its "rail growth programme" which included stations at Apperley Bridge and Kirkstall Forge.  A public exhibition of the plans took place in June 2009 with the planning application submitted to Leeds City Council in March 2010 and approval being granted in June 2010.

Despite significant private sector funding, the larger Rail Growth Programme including Apperley Bridge was listed as a schemes under government review in June 2010.

Following the Comprehensive Spending Review in Autumn 2010 the Leeds Rail Growth Package was included in the "Development" pool of schemes.  Metro submitted a "Best & Final Funding Bid" in September 2011 and funding was confirmed November 2011 as part of the National Infrastructure Plan.

On 29 May 2014 the Department for Transport committed £9.5 million from a total of £16 million towards the Leeds Rail Growth scheme which included both Kirkstall Forge and Apperley Bridge stations.  Works began in November 2014 by designers Amey Plc and the principal contractor C Spencers Ltd on behalf of Network Rail with completion of both stations expected by winter 2015. Partly due to flooding, work for the wider non-rail Kirkstall site ran behind schedule and its opening was delayed until June 2016. It eventually opened on 19 June.

References

External links

Railway stations in Leeds
Category;DfT Category F2 stations
Railway stations in Great Britain opened in 2016
Railway stations opened by Network Rail
Northern franchise railway stations
Kirkstall